Crown House may refer to:
Crown House, St Leonards-on-Sea, a building in East Sussex
Crown House, Kidderminster, a building featured in Demolition
 Crown House, a residence Hall at the University of Chicago
 Crown House, a residence hall at University of Reading
 Crown House, a 1988 book by Peter Ling
 Crown House Engineering, acquired by Laing O'Rourke construction company in 2004
 Crown House Publishing, a publishing company based in Wales